JVx Framework (or JVx - Enterprise Application Framework) is an open source software framework for the Java platform. JVx facilitates the development of professional and efficient database applications, in a short time and using little source code. 

The framework's architecture is based on the multitier architecture model for the development of software systems. Building on a three-tier architecture and following the dependency inversion principle JVx allows for easy development of efficiently maintained applications. The framework provides full support for all tiers. 

 A database, or alternatives such as the file system, can be used as data tier.
 The application tier is provided via an integrated communication server. This server supports the administration of sessions and the application logic.
 The presentation tier is technology-independent and can be used with various technologies, such as Swing, SWT, Vaadin, etc.

Goals 
JVx aims to save developers time so that they can focus their efforts on application-specific tasks. Technological hurdles are cleared by the framework. Less time is spent on simple tasks, such as the creation of templates for master data. JVx reduces the overall development effort by providing solutions for repetitive tasks.

Functionality 
JVx offers the following features, among others:
 Automatic list boxes based on the database model
 Generic and technology-independent user interface
 Uniform active model for all GUI components
 Data and database independence
 Data is not loaded until it is accessed (lazy loading)
 Server side session and object management
 Internationalization at the component level
 Complete application framework
 Synchronous and asynchronous communication
 Communication using client and server actions
 Up- und download of data/files
 Integrated picture management

Implementations 
For the presentation layer (client) the following implementations exist
 Swing (Application, Applet Java Web Start – JNLP)
 JavaFX
 Headless
 Vaadin
 react
 Flutter (native)

Enhancements 
Several enhancements exist for JVx that result in a high level of comfort for use in enterprise applications. These include:
 Vaadin based online help
 JVxEE for usage with JPA and Java EE
 AddOns for use with Android
 JVx connector for usage with Vert.x

See also 
 Rich web application

Java (programming language) libraries
Widget toolkits
Web frameworks